Luomian is a Southern Loloish language of Yunnan, China. It is spoken in Xinyayong 新亚拥, Shangxincheng Township 上新城乡, Yuanyang County, Yunnan (Sun, et al. 2011).

References

Sources 
Sun Dongbo 孙东波; Li Guimei 李贵梅; Wang Qian 王谦; Yang Fengying 杨凤英. 2011. 国际哈尼/阿卡区域文化调查:  中国元阳县上新城哈尼族罗缅人文化实录. Kunming: Yunnan People's Press 云南人民出版社. 

Southern Loloish languages
Languages of China